Kim Ja-youn (born 28 April 1978) is a South Korean biathlete. She competed in two events at the 2002 Winter Olympics.

References

1978 births
Living people
Biathletes at the 2002 Winter Olympics
South Korean female biathletes
Olympic biathletes of South Korea
Place of birth missing (living people)
Asian Games medalists in biathlon
Asian Games medalists in ski orienteering
Biathletes at the 1999 Asian Winter Games
Biathletes at the 2003 Asian Winter Games
Ski-orienteers at the 2011 Asian Winter Games
Asian Games silver medalists for South Korea
Asian Games bronze medalists for South Korea
Medalists at the 1999 Asian Winter Games
Medalists at the 2011 Asian Winter Games
21st-century South Korean women